Woodland Park High School is a high school located at 151 Panther Way in Woodland Park, Colorado, United States. It is a part of the Woodland Park School District.

Mascot
The Woodland Park High School mascot is a black panther.

Extracurricular activities
Woodland Park High School offers many extracurricular activities. Sports include wrestling, boosters, boys' basketball, boys' soccer, cheerleading, cross country, football, girls' basketball, girls' soccer, golf, softball, track and field, volleyball and baseball.

References

External links 
 

Public high schools in Colorado
Schools in Teller County, Colorado